The 2003–04 BCAFL was the 19th full season of the British Collegiate American Football League, organised by the British Students American Football Association.

Changes from last season
Divisional Changes
The Northern Conference, Central Division became Western Division
The Southern Conference expanded from three Divisions to four (gaining a Southern Division)

Team Changes
Anglia Polytechnic University joined the Southern Conference, as the APU Phantoms
University of Brighton joined the Southern Conference, as the Tsunami
Glasgow Caledonian University joined the Northern Conference, as the Caledonian Roughriders
Lancaster Bombers moved within the Northern Conference from Eastern to Borders Division
Reading Knights moved within the Southern Conference from Central to Southern Division
Sheffield Hallam University joined the Northern Conference, as the Warriors
Southampton Stags moved within the Southern Conference from Western to Southern Division
Sunderland Kings withdrew after one season back
Surrey Stingers moved within the Southern Conference from Eastern to Southern Division
This increased the number of teams in BCAFL to 32.

Regular season

Northern Conference, Borders Division

Northern Conference, Eastern Division

Northern Conference, Western Division

Southern Conference, Central Division

Southern Conference, Eastern Division

Southern Conference, Western Division

Southern Conference, Southern Division

Playoffs

Note – the table does not indicate who played home or away in each fixture.

References

2003
2003 in British sport
2004 in British sport
2003 in American football
2004 in American football